The Royal Gold Tournament was a golf tournament on the British PGA circuit contested in 1962. It was played in a 12-man round-robin format at the Murcar Links Golf Club, Bridge of Don, Aberdeen, Scotland. Ralph Moffitt won the event with 18 points, 3 ahead of the rest of the field. It was the second round-robin event of the season, following the Esso Golden Tournament.

The competitors played each of the other 11 in an 18-hole stroke play contest. Matches were played as either four-balls or three-balls, so that 5 rounds of golf were contested, one in which they played three opponents and four in which they played two opponents.

Ralph Moffitt won 9 of the 11 matches, giving him 18 points, 3 ahead of the rest. He had scored 16 points before the final afternoon round, 5 ahead of anyone else, giving him a guaranteed victory at that point since only 4 points were available in the final  round. Bernard Hunt had the best aggregate score over the 5 rounds with a total of 351, one better than Ralph Moffitt, winning him an extra £25.

Winners

References

Golf tournaments in Scotland
Defunct golf tournaments
Sports competitions in Aberdeen
1962 in Scottish sport